24 Hours in the Life of a Woman is a 1931 German drama film directed by Robert Land and starring Henny Porten, Walter Rilla and Friedrich Kayßler. It is based on Stefan Zwieg's novella Twenty-Four Hours in the Life of a Woman. The film was produced by Seymour Nebenzal's Nero Film in conjunction with Porten's own production company. It was shot at the Terra Studios in Berlin. The film's art direction was by Franz Schroedter.

Plot 
Helga Vanroh never really got over the death of her husband and has withdrawn from life entirely. Her self-chosen loneliness comes to an abrupt end one day when she meets a young man in the casino who, like her, seems to be a lost soul. This man, Sascha, has the misfortune written all over his face. He loses bet after bet when gambling.

Helga is fascinated by him, finally follows Sascha to his hotel and is able to stop the desperate young man from committing suicide at the last moment. The two lonely people find each other, and Helga soon realizes that he has become more for her - more than a fleeting acquaintance, more than she originally wanted to allow. She spends the following day with him and eventually provides him with the financial means to break his apparent gambling addiction and travel on.

The young man then promises Helga that he will return to his homeland in view of the unexpected windfall. But Sascha is weak, and so Helga, to her great disappointment, has to realize that he is back at the gaming table the following evening, because his passion is stronger than any good intentions.

Cast
 Henny Porten as Helga Vanroh
 Walter Rilla as Sascha Lonay
 Friedrich Kayßler as Professor Merk
 Margo Lion as Frau Köhler
 Hermine Sterler as Erika
 Maria Koppenhöfer as Spielbankbesucherin
 Walter Steinbeck as Hotelgast
 Hadrian Maria Netto as Sekretär

References

Bibliography

External links 
 

1931 films
Films of the Weimar Republic
German drama films
1931 drama films
1930s German-language films
Films based on works by Stefan Zweig
Films directed by Robert Land
German black-and-white films
Films produced by Seymour Nebenzal
Films based on Austrian novels
Nero-Film films
Films shot at Terra Studios
1930s German films